The 2015 Cambridge City Council election took place on 7 May 2015 to elect members of Cambridge City Council in England as part of the English local elections of that year coinciding with the 2015 General Election.

Results summary

Ward results

References

2015 English local elections
May 2015 events in the United Kingdom
2015
2010s in Cambridge